Brian Raymond Bonin (born November 28, 1973) is an American former professional ice hockey center.  He was drafted in the ninth round, 211th overall, by the Pittsburgh Penguins in the 1992 NHL Entry Draft.

Playing career
After being named Minnesota Mr. Hockey in 1992 for his play at White Bear Lake Area High School, Bonin entered the University of Minnesota.  His stellar time with the Golden Gophers culminated with winning the Hobey Baker Award, given to the most outstanding collegiate hockey player in the NCAA, in his senior season.  Bonin led the nation in scoring during the 1995-1996 season at the University of Minnesota, and was named a first-team All-American, WCHA Player of the Year, first-team All-WCHA, and team Most Valuable Player in both his junior and senior seasons

Bonin made his professional debut with the IHL's Cleveland Lumberjacks in the 1996–97 season.  He then joined the AHL's Syracuse Crunch for the 1997–98 season, tallying 69 points in 67 games.

Bonin made his NHL debut with the Penguins in the 1998–99 season, appearing in five regular-season and three playoff games.  The rest of the season was split between the IHL's Kansas City Blades and the AHL's Adirondack Red Wings.  After another full season with the Syracuse Crunch and most of one with the Cleveland Lumberjacks, Bonin joined the Minnesota Wild for seven NHL games in the 2000–01 season.  

In his 12 career NHL games, Bonin was held off the scoresheet.  He also went scoreless in his three career Stanley Cup playoff games.

Career statistics

Regular season and playoffs

International

Awards and honors

References

External links

1973 births
Living people
Adirondack Red Wings players
American men's ice hockey centers
Cleveland Lumberjacks players
Hobey Baker Award winners
Ice hockey people from Saint Paul, Minnesota
Sportspeople from White Bear Lake, Minnesota
Kansas City Blades players
Minnesota Golden Gophers men's ice hockey players
Minnesota Wild players
Pittsburgh Penguins draft picks
Pittsburgh Penguins players
SCL Tigers players
Syracuse Crunch players
Worcester IceCats players
AHCA Division I men's ice hockey All-Americans